The intermediate horseshoe bat (Rhinolophus affinis) is a bat species of the family Rhinolophidae (“nose crest”) that is very widespread throughout much of the Indian subcontinent, southern and central China and Southeast Asia. It is listed by IUCN as Least Concern as it is considered common where it occurs, without any known major threats.

Taxonomy
The intermediate horseshoe bat was described as a new species in 1823 by American naturalist Thomas Horsfield. The holotype was collected on the Indonesian island of Java.

Rhinolophus affinis is divided into the following nine subspecies:

 R. a. affinis
 R. a. andamanensis
 R. a. hainanus
 R. a. himalayanus
 R. a. macrurus
 R. a. nesites
 R. a. princes
 R. a. superans
 R. a. tener

It varies in appearance and echolocation characteristics throughout its range, suggesting that this taxon may represent a species complex of closely related species.

Description

Distribution
The intermediate horseshoe bat is widely distributed throughout Asia, occurring from India and China throughout Southeast Asia. It is found in Bangladesh, Bhutan, Brunei, Cambodia, China, India, Indonesia, Malaysia, Myanmar, Nepal, Thailand, and Vietnam. The easternmost extent of its range are the Indonesian Lesser Sunda Islands and Java.

References

External links
 
 
 Sound recordings of Rhinolophus affinis on BioAcoustica

Rhinolophidae
Bats of Asia
Bats of Southeast Asia
Bats of Indonesia
Bats of Malaysia
Mammals of Bangladesh
Bats of China
Mammals of India
Mammals of Nepal
Mammals of Bhutan
Least concern biota of Asia
Mammals described in 1823
Taxonomy articles created by Polbot
Taxa named by Thomas Horsfield
Bats of India